D101 may refer to :
 D101 road (Croatia), a state road connecting D100 state road to Merag ferry port
 Demonology 101, an online graphic novel written and drawn by Faith Erin Hicks